Jeff Joseph Graba (born December 26, 1968) is an American college gymnastics coach. He is currently the head coach of the Auburn Tigers women's gymnastics team and has been since 2010.

Early life 
Jeff Joseph Graba was born on December 26, 1968, in Wadena, Minnesota, to parents, Joseph, a trustee of Hamline University, and Sylvia (née Eide) Graba, an accountant. He has a twin brother, Jess, who owns Midwest Gymnastics. Graba was born in Wadena but grew up in Forest Lake, Minnesota.
He is a graduate of Forest Lake Area High School.

References 

1968 births
People from Wadena, Minnesota
University of Minnesota alumni
Living people